Leucorhynchia candida is a species of sea snail, a marine gastropod mollusk in the family Skeneidae.

Distribution
This marine species occurs off Japan.

References

 A. Adams (pl. 59, fig. 42). Ann. Mag. N. H. 1862, p. 296.— Conch. Icon., f. 14.
 Higo, S., Callomon, P. & Goto, Y. (1999) Catalogue and Bibliography of the Marine Shell-Bearing Mollusca of Japan. Elle Scientific Publications, Yao, Japan, 749 pp

External links
 To World Register of Marine Species

candida
Gastropods described in 1862